Symplegma is a genus of ascidian tunicates in the family Styelidae.

Species within the genus Symplegma include:
 Symplegma alterna Monniot, 1988 
 Symplegma arenosa Kott, 1972 
 Symplegma bahraini Monniot & Monniot, 1997 
 Symplegma brakenhielmi (Michaelsen, 1904) 
 Symplegma connectens Tokioka, 1949 
 Symplegma japonica Tokioka, 1962 
 Symplegma reptans (Oka, 1927) 
 Symplegma rubra Monniot, 1972 
 Symplegma teruakii Kott, 2004 
 Symplegma viride Herdman, 1886 
 Symplegma zebra Monniot, 2002

Species names currently considered to be synonyms:
 Symplegma connectans Tokioka, 1949: synonym of Symplegma connectens Tokioka, 1949 
 Symplegma elegans Michaelsen, 1934: synonym of Symplegma viride Herdman, 1886 
 Symplegma oceania Tokioka, 1961: synonym of Symplegma brakenhielmi (Michaelsen, 1904) 
 Symplegma okai (Redikorzev, 1916): synonym of Kukenthalia borealis (Gottschaldt, 1894) 
 Symplegma stuhlmanni (Michaelsen, 1904): synonym of Symplegma brakenhielmi (Michaelsen, 1904) 
 Symplegma systematica (Sluiter, 1904): synonym of Chorizocarpa sydneyensis (Herdman, 1891) 
 Symplegma viridis : synonym of Symplegma viride Herdman, 1886

References

Stolidobranchia
Tunicate genera
Taxa named by William Abbott Herdman